{{DISPLAYTITLE:C2H5NO2}}
The molecular formula C2H5NO2 (molar mass: 75.07 g/mol, exact mass: 75.0320 u) may refer to:

 Acetohydroxamic acid
 Ethyl nitrite
 Glycine
 Methyl carbamate
 Nitroethane